Lola Arias (born 3 December 1976) is an Argentine actress, writer, and film and theater director.

Biography
She founded the Postnuclear Company, an interdisciplinary group of artists with whom she develops various theater, literature, music, and visual arts projects. She composes music for their works with Ulises Conti.

Her work is wide and varied, including literature, theater, poetry, music, performances, films, and stories in Argentine magazines and newspapers. She collaborates with artists from different disciplines on art, music, and film projects. Her compositions cross the border between fiction and reality. In collaboration with the Swiss artist Stefan Kaegi she developed documentary theater projects such as Chácara Paraíso and Airport Kids.

In theater, Arias has incorporated not only actors into her work, but also policemen, beggars, dancers, prostitutes, musicians, children, and animals. In her play Striptease (2007), the protagonist is a one-year-old baby; in El amor es un francotirador (2008), a rock band plays live while the actors tell love stories; in Mi vida después (2009), six young people reconstruct, from letters, photos, used clothes, cassettes, etc., the youth of their parents in the 1970s.

Her texts have been translated into seven languages and presented at festivals around the world, such as Steirischer Herbst in Graz, Festival d'Avignon, Theater Spektakel in Zurich, We are Here in Dublin, Spielart Festival in Munich, Alkantara Festival in Lisbon, Radicals Festival in Barcelona, Under the Radar Festival in New York, and in art spaces such as Red Cat LA, the Walker Art Center in Minneapolis, and the Museum of Contemporary Art, Chicago.

The Square (2017 film)
 
Arias was not involved in creating the film's titular work, and publicly denounced director Ruben Östlund for using her name without her consent. Östlund denied the allegation, saying that she had agreed to it and was misremembering their interaction. He provided proof of the veracity of his story in the form of an interview he conducted with Lola Arias about the creation of The Square.

Works
 Las impúdicas en el paraíso (poetry collection, 2000)
 La escuálida familia (theater, performed at the Teatro Rojas, 2001)
 Estudios de la memoria amorosa (theater, performed at the Centro Experimental del Colón, 2003)
 Poses para dormir (theater, 2004)
 Trilogy Striptease, Sueño con revólver, and El amor es un francotirador (theater, Ed. Entropía, 2004)
 El amor es un francotirador (album of music together with Ulises Conti, 2007)
 Familienbande (theater, 2009)
 Mi nombre cuando yo ya no exista (theater, Ed. Cierto Pez, Chile, 2009)
 That enemy with in (theater, 2010)
 Los posnucleares (book of short stories, Ed. Emecé, 2011)
 Los que no duermen (album of music together with Ulises Conti, 2011)
 Melancolía y Manifestaciones (theater, 2012)
 El año en que nací (theater, 2012)
 El arte de hacer dinero (theater, inspired by The Threepenny Opera by Bertolt Brecht, 2013)
 Mis documentos (cycle of performance lectues, 2012, 2013, 2014)

Filmography

Director
   (2018)

Actress
 Cien pesos (2003, short)
 Potestad as Adriana's mother (2003)
 La prisionera as Isabel (2006)
  as Alicia (2008)

Awards and recognitions
 2014 Konex Award Diploma of Merit as one of the five most important figures in Argentine letters in the discipline "Teatro: Quinquenio 2009–2013"

References

External links
 
 

1976 births
21st-century Argentine actresses
21st-century Argentine women writers
21st-century Argentine writers
Actresses from Buenos Aires
Argentine theatre directors
Argentine women poets
Living people
University of Buenos Aires alumni
Women theatre directors
Writers from Buenos Aires